The following species in the flowering plant genus Verbesina, often known as crownbeards, are accepted by Plants of the World Online. Although the genus originated in North America, the greatest diversity is now found in South America.

Verbesina abietifolia 
Verbesina abscondita 
Verbesina acapulcensis 
Verbesina acuminata 
Verbesina agricolarum 
Verbesina alata 
Verbesina albissima 
Verbesina alcabrerae 
Verbesina aligera 
Verbesina allophylla 
Verbesina alternifolia 
Verbesina altipetens 
Verbesina ampliatifolia 
Verbesina ancashensis 
Verbesina angulata 
Verbesina angusta 
Verbesina angustifolia 
Verbesina angustissima 
Verbesina apiculata 
Verbesina apleura 
Verbesina aramberrana 
Verbesina arborea 
Verbesina aristata 
Verbesina aspera 
Verbesina auriculata 
Verbesina auriculigera 
Verbesina aurita 
Verbesina ayabacensis 
Verbesina aypatensis 
Verbesina baccharidea 
Verbesina baccharifolia 
Verbesina badilloi 
Verbesina barclayae 
Verbesina barragana 
Verbesina barrancae 
Verbesina baruensis 
Verbesina benderi 
Verbesina bipinnatifida 
Verbesina biserrata 
Verbesina blakeana 
Verbesina bolanosana 
Verbesina boliviana 
Verbesina brachypoda 
Verbesina breedlovei 
Verbesina brevilingua 
Verbesina brunnea 
Verbesina cabrerae 
Verbesina cajamarcensis 
Verbesina calciphila 
Verbesina caleifolia 
Verbesina callacatensis 
Verbesina callilepis 
Verbesina calzadae 
Verbesina capituliparva 
Verbesina caracasana 
Verbesina carangolensis 
Verbesina carranzae 
Verbesina caymanensis 
Verbesina centroboyacana 
Verbesina chachapoyensis 
Verbesina chapmanii 
Verbesina chiapensis 
Verbesina chihuahuensis 
Verbesina chilapana 
Verbesina cinerea 
Verbesina citrina 
Verbesina clarkiae 
Verbesina claussenii 
Verbesina coahuilensis 
Verbesina columbiana 
Verbesina contumacensis 
Verbesina corral-diazii 
Verbesina coulteri 
Verbesina crassicaulis 
Verbesina crassicephala 
Verbesina crassipes 
Verbesina crassiramea 
Verbesina crocata 
Verbesina cronquistii 
Verbesina cuautlensis 
Verbesina culminicola 
Verbesina cumingii 
Verbesina curatella 
Verbesina cymbipalea 
Verbesina daviesiae 
Verbesina densifolia 
Verbesina dentata 
Verbesina dilloniana 
Verbesina diluta 
Verbesina dissita 
Verbesina diversifolia 
Verbesina domingensis 
Verbesina durangensis 
Verbesina ecuatoriana 
Verbesina eggersii 
Verbesina ekmanii 
Verbesina elegans 
Verbesina elgalloana 
Verbesina encelioides 
Verbesina eperetma 
Verbesina erosa 
Verbesina etlana 
Verbesina fastigiata 
Verbesina fayi 
Verbesina felgeri 
Verbesina flavovirens 
Verbesina floribunda 
Verbesina fraseri 
Verbesina furfuracea 
Verbesina fuscasiccans 
Verbesina fuscicaulis 
Verbesina fusiformis 
Verbesina gentryi 
Verbesina gigantea 
Verbesina glabrata 
Verbesina glaucophylla 
Verbesina gracilipes 
Verbesina grandifolia 
Verbesina grandis 
Verbesina grayi 
Verbesina guadeloupensis 
Verbesina guaranitica 
Verbesina guatemalensis 
Verbesina guerreroana 
Verbesina guianensis 
Verbesina harlingii 
Verbesina hastata 
Verbesina hastifolia 
Verbesina helianthoides 
Verbesina heterophylla 
Verbesina hexantha 
Verbesina hidalgoana 
Verbesina hintoniorum 
Verbesina hispida 
Verbesina holwayi 
Verbesina howardiana 
Verbesina huancabambae 
Verbesina huaranchaliana 
Verbesina humboldtii 
Verbesina hygrophila 
Verbesina hypargyrea 
Verbesina hypoglauca 
Verbesina hypomalaca 
Verbesina hypsela 
Verbesina intermissa 
Verbesina jacksonii 
Verbesina jelskii 
Verbesina jimrobbinsii 
Verbesina juxtlahuacensis 
Verbesina karsticola 
Verbesina killipii 
Verbesina kimii 
Verbesina kingii 
Verbesina klattii 
Verbesina laevifolia 
Verbesina laevis 
Verbesina lanata 
Verbesina langfordiae 
Verbesina langlassei 
Verbesina lanulosa 
Verbesina lapazii 
Verbesina latisquama 
Verbesina lehmannii 
Verbesina leivae 
Verbesina leprosa 
Verbesina leptochaeta 
Verbesina leucactinota 
Verbesina liebmannii 
Verbesina ligulata 
Verbesina lilloi 
Verbesina lindheimeri 
Verbesina linearis 
Verbesina lloensis 
Verbesina longifolia 
Verbesina longipes 
Verbesina lopez-mirandae 
Verbesina lottiana 
Verbesina luetzelburgii 
Verbesina luisana 
Verbesina lundellii 
Verbesina macbridei 
Verbesina macdonaldii 
Verbesina machucana 
Verbesina macrophylla 
Verbesina macvaughii 
Verbesina madrensis 
Verbesina malacophylla 
Verbesina maldonadoensis 
Verbesina mameana 
Verbesina medullosa 
Verbesina mexiae 
Verbesina miahuatlana 
Verbesina mickelii 
Verbesina microcarpa 
Verbesina microptera 
Verbesina minarum 
Verbesina minuticeps 
Verbesina mixtecana 
Verbesina mollis 
Verbesina monactioides 
Verbesina montanoifolia 
Verbesina monteverdensis 
Verbesina myriocephala 
Verbesina nana 
Verbesina nayaritensis 
Verbesina negrensis 
Verbesina nelsonii 
Verbesina neotenoriensis 
Verbesina neriifolia 
Verbesina nervosa 
Verbesina nicotianifolia 
Verbesina nudipes 
Verbesina oaxacana 
Verbesina occidentalis 
Verbesina ochroleucotricha 
Verbesina oerstediana 
Verbesina oligactis 
Verbesina oligantha 
Verbesina oligocephala 
Verbesina olsenii 
Verbesina oncophora 
Verbesina oreophila 
Verbesina ortegae 
Verbesina otophylla 
Verbesina otuzcensis 
Verbesina ovata 
Verbesina ovatifolia 
Verbesina oxylepis 
Verbesina pallens 
Verbesina palmeri 
Verbesina paneroi 
Verbesina pantoptera 
Verbesina papasquiara 
Verbesina parviflora 
Verbesina paucicephala 
Verbesina pauciflora 
Verbesina pauciramea 
Verbesina pedunculosa 
Verbesina pellucida 
Verbesina peninsularis 
Verbesina pennellii 
Verbesina pentalobifolia 
Verbesina pentantha 
Verbesina peraffinis 
Verbesina perijaensis 
Verbesina perlanata 
Verbesina persicifolia 
Verbesina peruviana 
Verbesina perymenioides 
Verbesina petrobioides 
Verbesina petrophila 
Verbesina petzalensis 
Verbesina pflanzii 
Verbesina phlebodes 
Verbesina pichinchensis 
Verbesina pietatis 
Verbesina pilosa 
Verbesina piurana 
Verbesina planitiei 
Verbesina platanara 
Verbesina platyptera 
Verbesina pleistocephala 
Verbesina plowmanii 
Verbesina polyanthes 
Verbesina portlandiana 
Verbesina potosina 
Verbesina propinqua 
Verbesina pseudoclaussenii 
Verbesina pseudovirgata 
Verbesina pterocarpha 
Verbesina pterocaula 
Verbesina pterophora 
Verbesina purpusii 
Verbesina pustulata 
Verbesina quetamensis 
Verbesina resinosa 
Verbesina retifera 
Verbesina reyesii 
Verbesina rhomboidea 
Verbesina richardsonii 
Verbesina rivetii 
Verbesina robinsonii 
Verbesina rosei 
Verbesina rothrockii 
Verbesina rugosa 
Verbesina rupestris 
Verbesina saltensis 
Verbesina salvadorensis 
Verbesina sanchezii 
Verbesina santanderensis 
Verbesina sararensis 
Verbesina saubinetia 
Verbesina saubinetioides 
Verbesina scabrida 
Verbesina scabriuscula 
Verbesina scotiodonta 
Verbesina seatonii 
Verbesina semidecurrens 
Verbesina sericea 
Verbesina serrata 
Verbesina simplicicaulis 
Verbesina simulans 
Verbesina sinaloensis 
Verbesina sodiroi 
Verbesina sordescens 
Verbesina sororia 
Verbesina sousae 
Verbesina sphaerocephala 
Verbesina spooneri 
Verbesina steinmannii 
Verbesina stenophylla 
Verbesina strotheri 
Verbesina subcordata 
Verbesina subdiscoidea 
Verbesina suberosa 
Verbesina subrotundifolia 
Verbesina suncho 
Verbesina synethes 
Verbesina synotis 
Verbesina tachirensis 
Verbesina tamaulipana 
Verbesina tamaunuevana 
Verbesina tapantiana 
Verbesina tatei 
Verbesina tecolotlana 
Verbesina tenoriesis 
Verbesina teotepecana 
Verbesina tequendamensis 
Verbesina tequilana 
Verbesina tetraptera 
Verbesina textitlana 
Verbesina tiburonensis 
Verbesina torresii 
Verbesina tostimontis 
Verbesina tovarii 
Verbesina trichantha 
Verbesina trilobata 
Verbesina trujillensis 
Verbesina turbacensis 
Verbesina vallartana 
Verbesina venosa 
Verbesina villaregalis 
Verbesina villasenorii 
Verbesina villonacoensis 
Verbesina virgata 
Verbesina virginica 
Verbesina walteri 
Verbesina xanthochlora 
Verbesina xicoana 
Verbesina zaragosana

References

Verbesina